The third season of Teenage Mutant Ninja Turtles began airing on Nickelodeon on October 3, 2014. On February 26, 2013, Nickelodeon ordered a third season of Teenage Mutant Ninja Turtles.

The third season tells the story of the Turtles, April O'Neil and Casey Jones, who are required to abandon their lair in the New York City sewers to Northampton, Massachusetts, to their eventual return home and driving out the Kraang and undo their hold on the hundreds of mutated humans.

Plot
In the first half of the third season, after the events of previous season, the turtles are recuperating at O'Neil's farmhouse. While dealing with multiple mutants, they also find a Kraang clone in the likeness of April's mother, leading them to realize that she possesses psychological abilities because the Kraang experimented on her mother when she was pregnant. They eventually return to New York and save Splinter who has become mindless and bring him back. They team up with the Mighty Mutanimals (Slash, Leatherhead, Dr. Rockwell, and Pigeon Pete) and save the Humans and New York from the Kraang.

The second half of the season focuses on the turtles and the Shredder trying to bring Karai back, the latter succeeds and creates a brain worm to control her, the turtles and Splinter eventually free her from Shredder's control but she is lost again.

At the end of the season, the turtles meet Zog, a Triceraton who is investigating Kraang activity on earth, due to lack of the air they breathe, he first mistakes the turtles as allies and leads them to realize that the Kraang are still active on earth. After finding his equipment and being able to breath, Zog turns against the turtles and alerts the Triceraton Empire before falling to his doom. The turtles then meet Bishop, an Utrom who is the same species as Kraang and tells them about the history between Kraang and the Triceratons, that the two alien species fighting for control over Dimension X with the Triceratons gaining the upper hand until the Kraang used the black hole generator and destroyed their planet with a single fleet surviving, he then warns them that both the Kraang and Triceratons are plan to invade Earth and if the latter arrive after the former, they will destroy the planet. The turtles try to stop Kraang from rising the Technodrome but fail and the Triceratons destroy it with Kraang Prime and Kraang Subprime in it, they then try to activate the black hole generator on Earth, the turtles join with allies and enemies to prevent Earth's destruction but Shredder betrays them and kills Splinter for revenge, uncaring for the consequences. As the planet is being destroyed, the turtles are saved by a robot calling himself Professor Honeycutt, who offers them a chance to save their world.

Production
Jason Biggs departed the role of Leonardo after the 19th episode of season 2 and was temporarily replaced by Dominic Catrambone. Seth Green assumed the role beginning in season 3; in the show's universe, the change of voice was explained due to Leonardo having wounded his vocal cords. At San Diego Comic-Con International 2014, new characters such as the Dream Beavers and Napoleon Bonafrog would be making appearances. Actor Robbie Rist, who previously voiced Michelangelo in the first three films, voiced Mondo Gecko in the season. Renae Jacobs, who voiced April O'Neil in the 1987–1996 television series, guest-starred as Mrs. O'Neil and an alien.

Broadcast
The season debuted on Nickelodeon in Australia on February 7, 2015.

Episodes

References

External links

3
2014 American television seasons
2015 American television seasons
Television shows set in Massachusetts
Television shows set in Japan
Television shows set in England
Television series set in the Middle Ages
Television episodes about alien invasion